Peter Ronald Horne  is a New Zealand Paralympian who competed in lawn bowls. At the 1988 Summer Paralympics, he won a gold medal in the Singles LB3, and a bronze medal in the Pairs LB2. He also competed at the 1996 Summer Paralympics.

In the 2021 Queen's Birthday Honours, Horne was appointed a Member of the New Zealand Order of Merit, for services to bowls and Paralympic sport.

References

External links 
 
 

Year of birth missing (living people)
New Zealand male bowls players
Lawn bowls players at the 1988 Summer Paralympics
Lawn bowls players at the 1996 Summer Paralympics
Paralympic gold medalists for New Zealand
Paralympic bronze medalists for New Zealand
Medalists at the 1988 Summer Paralympics
Living people
Paralympic medalists in lawn bowls
Members of the New Zealand Order of Merit